Nowingi is a locality in Victoria, Australia, approximately  south of Mildura. It is in the local government area of the Rural City of Mildura.

History 

In May 2004, unreserved Crown land, roughly five kilometres south of Nowingi, was declared the Government's preferred site for the state's hazardous industrial waste using a long-term waste containment facility. The plan was cancelled however, when local protesters marched to Parliament House forcing the Government to look elsewhere. The Minister for Planning's Assessment and Panel Inquiry report found the proposal environmentally feasible but recommended against it based on strategic planning issues.

The site is a small enclave of state forest surrounded by national park, and contains habitat important to a number of threatened species.

Its hydrological composition was disputed, the Environmental Effects Statement (EES) investigations and subsequent evidence predicted that contaminated moisture would take greater than 1000 years to move though the LTCF barrier system. Transport modelling of groundwater contaminants predicted that if contaminants did enter the groundwater, they would move slowly through the Blanchetown Clay and then in a westerly to north-westerly direction towards the Raak Plains, taking thousands of years to finally discharge within the Raak Boinkas in the Murray-Sunset National Park, while local opponents claimed it would flow east through Hattah-Kulkyne National Park into the Murray River.

The site was going to be around 500 km away from Melbourne, where most of the waste is generated.  Local opponents to the LTCF argued that transporting the waste would have incurred higher costs and create more opportunity for accident than a LTCF closer to Melbourne.

Local opponents, a group called "Save the Food Bowl Alliance" and local media branded the LTCF the "Mallee Toxic Waste Dump".  The chairman of the "Save the Food Bowl Alliance", Peter Crisp, was elected to Victorian Parliament in 2006, campaigning on this issue.

In January 2007, the Victorian Government announced that it was abandoning its proposal to build the Long Term Containment Facility at Nowingi.

The Panel Inquiry report found the proposal to be environmentally feasible but recommended against granting approval on strategic planning grounds.  Specifically because it:
 Could fill too soon to provide a sustainable solution for Victoria's Category B wastes;
 Cannot be reasonably or readily expanded because of its surrounds;
 Would be between two National Parks;
 Would be located in high conservation value remnant vegetation which is habitat of threatened species;
 Would be too distant from waste producers; and
 Would be as a lesser but relevant consideration, constrained by the need to suspend construction during the breeding period of mallee emu-wren and malleefowl.

The abandoning of the LTCF proposal was received with jubilation by opponents of the LTCF not only in the Mildura area and elsewhere in Victoria, but also across the border in South Australia where there were fears that in reputation, if not in substance, the toxic waste could affect the water supply via the Murray River and thereby the fruit-growing industries of the Riverland and Murraylands.

The Mildura Rural City Council and residents spent almost $2 million fighting the Government's proposal for the LTCF at Nowingi.  On 10 January 2007 the Victorian Government did not rule out some form of reimbursement for the Rural City of Mildura council's legal and other costs in opposing the LTCF.  "The general rule is that people bear their own costs, that is most likely to apply in this case ... but I've indicated and I am prepared to talk to the council and mayor about the whole issue of how Mildura moves forward and I'll do that," John Thwaites said.

References 

Towns in Victoria (Australia)